CCT5 may refer to:
CCT5 (gene)
South Brook Water Aerodrome, Newfoundland and Labrador, Canada: CT Location identifier CCT5